Viktor Kazakov (born 4 April 1949, Fergana, Uzbek Soviet Socialist Republic) is a Russian political figure and deputy of the 4th, 5th, 6th, 7th, and 8th State Dumas. 

In 1989, Kazakov started working as the chief engineer  and Deputy General Director of the Kuibyshevneft. In 1995, he was the First Vice President of Yukos Oil Company. In 1998, he was appointed vice president of the oil company YUKSI – a result of the merger of Yukos and Sibneft. However, the merger was soon annulated, and Kazakov became a board member of directors of the Eastern Oil Company. In July 2003, he was appointed First Vice-Governor of Samara Oblast. In 2003 he was elected deputy of the 4th State Duma. In 2007, 2011, 2016, and 2021, he was re-elected to the 4th, 5th, 6th, 7th, and 8th State Dumas from the Samara Oblast constituency. 

In 2016, Kazakov appeared on the list of potential recipients of a bribe in the amount of $ 2 billion in the Yukos shareholders v. Russia case. According to the case files, Yukos shareholders (among which was Kazakov) made payments to government officials who helped acquire the company's shares.

References

1949 births
Living people
United Russia politicians
21st-century Russian politicians
Eighth convocation members of the State Duma (Russian Federation)
Seventh convocation members of the State Duma (Russian Federation)
Sixth convocation members of the State Duma (Russian Federation)
Fifth convocation members of the State Duma (Russian Federation)
Fourth convocation members of the State Duma (Russian Federation)